Jamie Grant (born 23 June 1970) is a former Australian rules footballer who played for Footscray in the Australian Football League (AFL) in 1991. He was recruited from the Daylesford Football Club in the Central Highlands Football League with the 22nd selection in the 1990 Mid-year Draft.  He was also drafted by Sydney in the 1993 Mid-year Draft, but did not play a league game for them.

He is the older brother of Western Bulldogs club legend Chris Grant.

References

External links

Living people
1970 births
Western Bulldogs players
Daylesford Football Club players
Australian rules footballers from Victoria (Australia)